Hillcrest School may refer to any one of several schools, including:

in Australia
Hillcrest Christian College, a private school in Reedy Creek, Australia
Hillcrest Secondary College a public high school in Broadmeadows, Australia

in Canada
Hillcrest Community School, in Toronto, Ontario
Hillcrest Public School (London, ON), in London, Ontario
Hillcrest School (Moncton), in Moncton, New Brunswick
Hillcrest School, the former name of a school merged into Hillfield Strathallan College in Hamilton, Ontario
Hillcrest Public JR High School (Edmonton, AB) in Edmonton Alberta

in Indonesia
Hillcrest International School in Papua, Indonesia

in Kenya
Hillcrest School (Nairobi, Kenya)

in Malaysia
Hillcrest Secondary School (Seri Gombak, Malaysia) a public secondary school in Seri Gombak, Malaysia

in Nigeria
Hillcrest School (Jos, Nigeria)

in the United Kingdom
Hillcrest School, Birmingham, a secondary school in Birmingham, West Midlands, England
Hillcrest Grammar School, a former independent school in Davenport, Greater Manchester, England

in the United States
Hillcrest Christian School, a private school in Jackson, Mississippi, USA
Hillcrest Lutheran Academy, a private school in Minnesota, United States
Hillcrest Youth Correctional Facility, in Salem, Oregon, USA
Hillcrest School (Wisconsin)
Hillcrest School (Illinois)

in Zambia
Hillcrest Technical High School, a public high school in Livingstone, Zambia

in Zimbabwe
Hillcrest Preparatory School, an independent co-educational school in Mutare

See also
Hillcrest Elementary School (disambiguation)
Hillcrest Public School (disambiguation)
Hillcrest High School (disambiguation)
Hillcrest (disambiguation)